Weber's sailfin lizard or Halmahera sailfin dragon (Hydrosaurus weberi), is a species of lizard in the family Agamidae. The species is endemic to Indonesia.

Geographic range
H. weberi is only found on Halmahera and Ternate Islands of Maluku.

Longevity
H. weberi has a life-span of between 10 and 15 years.

Description

Diet
H. weberi is omnivorous; devouring whatever animal it can overpower plus consuming a variety of vegetation and fruit.

In captivity
In captivity, juveniles of H. weberi are usually maintained on a 60% insect / 40% vegetation diet. Adults consume approximately 75% vegetation and 25% insects and other non-vegetation life.

Reproduction
H. weberi is oviparous.

Etymology
The specific name, weberi, is in honor of German-Dutch zoologist Max Wilhelm Carl Weber van Bosse.

References

External links
Photos of Hydrosaurus weberi (French)

Further reading
Barbour T (1911). "New Lizards and a New Toad from the Dutch East Indies, with Notes on Other Species". Proceedings of the Biological Society of Washington 24: 15–22. (Hydrosaurus weberi, new species, pp. 20–21).
Barts M, Wilms T (2003). "Die Agamen der Welt". Draco 4 (14): 4-23. (in German).
Colwell GJ (1993). "Hydrosaurus weberi (Weber's sail-fin dragon)". Morphology Herpetological Review 24 (4): 150.
de Rooij N (1915). The Reptiles of the Indo-Australian Archipelago. I. Lacertilia, Chelonia, Emydosauria. Leiden: E. J. Brill. xiv + 384 pp.
Gábris J (2003). "Zur Haltung von philippinischen Segelechsen (Hydrosaurus pustulatus)". Draco 4 (14): 24–33. (in German).
Werning H (2002). Wasseragamen und Segelechsen. Münster: Natur und Tier Verlag. 127 pp. (in German). [review in Sauria 26 (4): 17.] 
Werning H (2004). "Bibliographie der Gattungen Physignathus, Lophognathus und Hydrosaurus". Iguana Rundschreiben 17 (2): 18–31. (in German).

Hydrosaurus
Reptiles described in 1911
Taxa named by Thomas Barbour